is a Japanese actress and singer who is affiliated with Ken Production. She sang the opening themes for Nogizaka Haruka no Himitsu under the name "Miran Himemiya and Chocolate Rockers".

Filmography

Anime
2003
Maburaho (Yūna Miyama)

2004
Maria Watches Over Us (Eriko Torii)
Daphne in the Brilliant Blue (May)
Futari wa Pretty Cure (Yumiko Nakagawa)
Mirmo Zibang! (Cameri)
Gantz (Kei Kishimoto)
Maria Watches Over Us Season 2: Printemps (Eriko Torii)
Ninja Nonsense (Kunoichi)
Elfen Lied (Shirakawa, Kouta (young))
School Rumble (Mikoto Suou)
Uta∽Kata (Izumi Tachibana)
Rockman.EXE Stream (Route)
Zoids Fuzors (Betty)
Desert Punk (Mariko)
Tactics (Shino)
Bleach (Young Kariya Jin, Misato Ochi, Nanao Ise, Ryō Kunieda)

2005
Pani Poni Dash! (Misao Nanjo)
Trinity Blood (Kate Scott)
Starship Operators (Dita Mirkob)
Ultimate Girls (Vivienne Ohtori)
Glass Mask (Cordelia)
Best Student Council (Kanade Jinguji)
Honey and Clover (Chouko)
Canvas 2 - Niji Iro no Sketch (Kiri Kikyou)
ToHeart2 (Yuma Tonami)
Hell Girl (Ayumi Shibata)
Shakugan no Shana (Margery Daw)
Solty Rei (Am Toranfa)
Strawberry Marshmallow (Nobue Itō)

2006
School Rumble: 2nd Semester (Mikoto Suou)
Renkin 3-kyuu Magical? Pokahn (Liru)
Strawberry Panic! (Shizuma Hanazono)
Girl's High (Eriko Takahashi)
Ray (Rie)
The Third: The Girl with the Blue Eye (Rona Fauna)
Coyote Ragtime Show (April)
Ramen Fighter Miki (Miki Onimaru)
Mamotte! Lollipop (Nina Yamada)
Buso Renkin (Ouka Hayasaka)
Brighter than the Dawning Blue (Feena Fam Earthlight)
Venus to Mamoru (Maria)

2007
Nodame Cantabile (Saiko Tagaya)
Rocket Girls (Matsuri)
Ikki-Tousen: Dragon Destiny (Unchou Kan'u)
Hayate the Combat Butler (Yukiji Katsura)
Gegege no Kitarō (Minori)
Nagasarete Airantou (Mei Mei)
Big Windup! (Momoko)
Kenko Zenrakei Suieibu Umisho (Momoko Orizuka)
Mushi-Uta (Rina Tachibana)
Sky Girls (Dr. Aki Yuko)
Shakugan no Shana Second (Margery Daw)
Prism Ark (Kagura, Comet, Meto)

2008
Yatterman (Tetsuto)
RIN - Daughters of Mnemosyne (Ruon Kamiyama)
Blassreiter (Sasha)
Blue Dragon: Trials of the Seven Shadows (Noi)
Nabari no Ou (Catalina Toudou)
Psychic Squad (Sera)
S · A: Special A (Akira Tōdō)
Ikki Tousen: Great Guardians (Unchou Kan'u)
Sekirei (Uzume)
Ryoko's Case File (Ryōko Yakushiji)
Nogizaka Haruka no Himitsu (Ruko Ayase)
Skip Beat! (Itsumi Momose)
Magician's Academy (Miyabi)
Chaos;Head (Sena Aoi)

2009
Maria Watches Over Us 4th Season (Eriko Torii, Nana Arima)
Samurai Harem (Angela Takatsukasa)
Queen's Blade: The Exiled Virgin (Shizuka)
Hayate the Combat Butler!! (Yukiji Katsura)
Polyphonica Crimson S (Elaine)
Beyblade: Shogun Steel (Osamu)
Natsu no Arashi! (Master/Sayaka)
Modern Magic Made Simple (Misa Anehara)
Queen's Blade 2: The Evil Eye (Shizuka)
A Certain Scientific Railgun (Dorm Supervisor)
Letter Bee (Nelli)
Natsu no Arashi! Akinai-chū (Master/Sayaka)
Nogizaka Haruka no Himitsu: Purezza (Ruko Ayase, Milan Himemiya)
Darker than Black: Gemini of the Meteor (Rikako)
Tamagotchi! (Clara Queen)

2010
Ikki Tōsen: Xtreme Xecutor (Unchō Kan'u)
Hime Chen! Otogi Chikku Idol Lilpri (Otohime)
Mayoi Neko Overrun! (Honoka's mother)
Ōkami-san & Her Seven Companions (Yukime Murano)
Sekirei: Pure Engagement (Uzume)
Panty & Stocking with Garterbelt (Wife Petter)
Psychic Detective Yakumo (Mao Arai)
Oreimo (Saori Makishima)
Squid Girl (Cindy Campbell)
Fortune Arterial: Akai Yakusoku (Yuuki Kanade)

2011
Cardfight!! Vanguard (Asaka Narumi)
Beelzebub (Torii)
30-sai no Hoken Taiiku (Wada-san)
Astarotte's Toy (Judit Snorrevík)
Heaven's Memo Pad (Min-san)
Natsume's Book of Friends (Yōkai Possessing Tanuma)
Squid Girl Season 2 (Cindy Campbell)
Persona 4: The Animation (Noriko Kashiwagi)
Shakugan no Shana III (Margery Daw)

2012
Tantei Opera Milky Holmes Dai-Ni-Maku (Higgs)
High School DxD (Raynare/Yūma Amano)
Kuromajo-san ga Toru!! (Ryōtarō Asakura)
Is This a Zombie? of the Dead (Chris)
Sengoku Collection (Yamaguchi)
Place to Place (Mayoi Katase)
Muv-Luv Alternative: Total Eclipse (Cryska Barchenowa)
The Ambition of Oda Nobuna (Shibata Katsuie)
Hayate the Combat Butler: Can't Take My Eyes Off You (Yukiji Katsura)
Hidamari Sketch × Honeycomb (Andō)
Girls und Panzer (Erika Itsumi)

2013
Dokidoki! Precure (Mana Aida / Cure Heart)
Oreimo 2 (Saori Makishima)
Danchi Tomoo (Mitsuo Kikugawa)
Hayate the Combat Butler! Cuties (Yukiji Katsura)
A Certain Scientific Railgun S (Tokiwadai Dorm Supervisor)
White Album 2 (Kazusa Touma)
Walkure Romanze (Akane Ryūzōji)
Pocket Monsters: XY (Saki, Citron's Harimaron)

2014
Nisekoi (Kyoko)
Akame ga Kill! (Nyau)
Black Bullet (Shiina Kazumi)
Rail Wars! (Sakura Kadota)
Fate/kaleid liner Prisma Illya (Bazett Fraga McRemitz)
Invaders of the Rokujyōma!? (Broadcasting Committee Member)

2015
Aldnoah.Zero 2 (Rafia)
Rin-ne (Rokumon)
Etotama (Shaa-tan)
Fate/kaleid liner Prisma Illya 2wei Herz! (Bazett Fraga McRemitz)
Sore ga Seiyū! (Hikari Shiodome)
Nisekoi (Kyoko)
High School DxD BorN (Raynare)
Shokugeki no Soma (Fumio Daimidō (Young))
Nisekoi: (Kyoko)
Fate/kaleid liner Prisma Illya 2wei Herz! (Bazett Fraga McRemitz)
Pocket Monsters: XY&Z (Citron's Harimaron)

2016
Ooya-san wa Shishunki! (Reiko Shirai)
Aokana: Four Rhythm Across the Blue (Botan Arisaka)
Rin-ne 2 (Rokumon)
Kono Subarashii Sekai ni Shukufuku o! (Sena / Chomusuke)
Haven't You Heard? I'm Sakamoto (Yagi)
Haruchika (Minami Kamijō)
Mobile Suit Gundam: Iron-Blooded Orphans (Yamazin Toker)

2017
Chaos;Child (Aoi Sena)
Saekano: How to Raise a Boring Girlfriend Flat (Akane Kosaka)
Is It Wrong to Try to Pick Up Girls in a Dungeon? On the Side (Tsubaki Collbrande)
Eromanga Sensei (Saori Bajiina)
Made in Abyss (Laffi)
Land of the Lustrous (Sphene)
Two Car (Hatsune Wada)
Dies irae (Isaak, Rea Himuro)
My Hero Academia (Setsuna Tokage)

2018
Kokkoku (Sanae Yukawa)
Junji Ito Collection (Soga)
Dragon Pilot: Hisone and Masotan (Eiko Akishima)
Free! -Dive to the Future- (Akane Kurimiya-Shiina)
Revue Starlight (Middle School Teacher)

2019
Circlet Princess (Reina Kuroda)
Sword Art Online: Alicization (Fanatio)
Fruits Basket (Mayuko Shiraki)
Why the Hell are You Here, Teacher!? (Saki Satô)
Demon Lord, Retry! (Mikan)
Vinland Saga (Ylva)
Astra Lost in Space (Paulina Levinskaya)

2020
Isekai Quartet 2 (Chomusuke)
Princess Connect! Re:Dive (Shizuru / Shizuru Hoshino)
Tower of God (Serena Rinnen)
Boruto: Naruto Next Generations (Victor's Secretary)

2021
The World Ends with You the Animation (Mitsuki Konishi)
Everything for Demon King Evelogia (Tishia)
Mieruko-chan (Tōko Yotsuya)
JoJo's Bizarre Adventure: Stone Ocean (Jolyne's Mother)

2022
Princess Connect! Re:Dive Season 2 (Shizuru / Shizuru Hoshino)
Tokyo 24th Ward (Sakiko Tsuzuragawa)
Girls' Frontline (Agent)
Date A Live IV (Nia Honjō)
Shin Ikki Tousen (Unchō Kan'u)

2023
KonoSuba: An Explosion on This Wonderful World! (Chomusuke)

Movies and original video animation (OVA)
2003
Lunar Legend Tsukihime (Arcueid Brunestud)

2005
School Rumble: Extra Class (Mikoto Suo)

2006
BALDR FORCE EXE Resolution (Ayane Shido)

2007
Shakugan no Shana The Movie (Margery Daw)
Bleach: The DiamondDust Rebellion (Nanao Ise)

2008
My-Otome 0~S.ifr~ (Sifr's mother)

2010
Mudazumo Naki Kaikaku (Mrs Hatoyama)

2011
Hayate the Combat Butler! Heaven Is a Place on Earth (Yukiji Katsura)
Astarotte no Omocha! (Judit Snorrevík)

2012
ToHeart2 Dungeon Travelers (Yuma Tonami)
Fairy Tail the Movie: Phoenix Priestess (Coordinator)

2013
Pretty Cure All Stars New Stage 2: Kokoro no Tomodachi (Mana Aida/Cure Heart)
DokiDoki! PreCure the Movie: Mana's Getting Married!!? The Dress of Hope Tied to the Future (Mana Aida/Cure Heart)

2014
Pretty Cure All Stars New Stage 3: Eien no Tomodachi (Mana Aida/Cure Heart)
Pokémon the Movie XY: The Cocoon of Destruction and Diancie (Citron's Harimaron, Ayaka's Absol)

2015
Pokémon the Movie XY - The Archdjinni of the Rings: Hoopa (Citron's Harimaron)

2016
Pokémon the Movie XY&Z: Volcanion and the Exquisite Magearna (Citron's Harimaron)

2018
Hug! Pretty Cure Futari wa Pretty Cure: All Stars Memories

Video games
2003
Samurai Shodown V (Rimururu/Chample)
2004
Suikoden IV (Honewort)
Gantz: The 2nd stage (Kei Kishimoto)
ToHeart2 (Yuma Tonami)

2005
Rumble Roses (Candy Cane / Becky)
Gantz (Kei Kishimoto)
Wild Arms the 4th Detonator (Raquel Applegate)
Mabino Style (Tomomi.O.Hiyama)
School Rumble Nee-san Jiken Desu! (Mikoto Suou)
School Rumble PS2 (Mikoto Suou)
Best Students Council (Kanade Jingūji)
Shadow of the Colossus (Mono)
Duel Savior Destiny (Nanashi)

2006
Rumble Roses XX (Candy Cane/Becky)
Canvas 2: Akane Iro no Palette (Kiri Kikyou)
Shakugan no Shana (Margery Daw)
Growlanser: Heritage of War (Elessa)
Carnage Heart Portable (Matilda)
Strawberry Panic! Girls' School in Fullbloom (Shizuma Hanazono)
Schoolgirl Game's High!! (Eriko Takahashi)
Bullet Witch (Alicia Claus)

2007
!Shin Chan: Flipa en colores! (Imitation)
Nodame Cantabile (Saiko Tagaya)
Ikkitousen Shining Dragon (Kanu)
The World Ends with You (Raimu, Konishi)
Hayate no Gotoku! Boku ga Romeo de Romeo ga Boku de (Yukiji Katsura)
Fate/tiger colosseum (Bazetto Fraga Makuremittsu) 
Nanatsuiro Drops Pure!! (Croix)
The Five Games and Kid (Momoko Orizuka)
Star Ocean: First Departure (Millie Kirito)

2008
Vampire Kitan Muntaizu (Mizuno Kanako)
Hayate no Gotoku! Ojousama Produce Daisakusen Boku Iro ni Somare! Gakkou-Hen (Yukiji Katsura)
Prism Ark: Awake (Kagura)
Chaos;Head (Aoi Sena)
Luminous Arc 2: Will (Ayano)
Soulcalibur IV (Amy, Ashlotte)
Fate/tiger colosseum Upper (Bazetto Fraga Makuremittsu)
Infinite Undiscovery (Arya)

2009
Final Fantasy Crystal Chronicles: Echoes of Time (Undead Celebrity, Irina)
Chaos;Head Noah (Aoi Sena)
Hayate no Gotoku! Nightmare Paradise (Yukiji Katsura)
Zettai Zetsumei Toshi 3: Kowareyuku Machi to Kanojo no Uta (Saki Honjo)
Arc Rise Fantasia (Sheryi)
Fate/unlimited codes Portable (Bazetto Fraga Makuremittsu)
Soulcalibur: Broken Destiny (Amy)
Tsuyokiss 2gakki: Swift Love (Serebu Tachibana)
ToHeart2 Portable (Yuma Tonami)
Sekirei: Mirai Kara no Okurimono (Uzume)
Queen's Blade: Spiral Chaos (Shizuka)

2010
White Album 2: Introductory Chapter (Kazusa Touma)
Everybody's Tennis Portable (Norma)
Yoake Mae yori Ruri Iro na Portable (Feena Fam Earthlight)
Nogizaka Haruka no Himitsu: Doujinshi Hajimemashita (Ruko Ayase)
Chaos;Head Love Chu Chu! (Aoi Sena)
Ikkitousen: Xross Impact (Kanu Unchou)
Chaos;Head Noah Portable (Aoi Sena)
Tsuyokiss 2gakki Portable (Serebu Tachibana)
Record of Agarest War 2 (Melvina)

2011
White Album 2: Closing Chapter (Kazusa Touma)
Chaos;Head Love Chu Chu! Portable (Aoi Sena)
Ore no Imōto ga Konnani Kawaii Wake ga Nai Portable ga Tsuzuku Wake ga Nai (Saori Makishima)
Otomedius Excellent (Diol Twee)
ToHeart2 DX Plus (Yuma Tonami)
Terror of the Stratus (Nanase Sasahara)
Toaru Kagaku no Railgun

2012
Soulcalibur V (Amy, Viola)
Dies Irae: Amantes Amentes (Rei Himuro, Issac)
Anarchy Reigns (Fei Rin)
Rune Factory 4 (Clorica)
Aquapazza: Aquaplus Dream Match (Yuna Tonami)
Suiheisen made Nan Mile? Original Flight (Himuka Nakano)
White Album 2: Shiawase no Mukogawa (Kazusa Touma)

2013
Monster Monpiece (Elsa)
Kajiri Kamui Kagura Akebono no Hikari (Tokoyo Tenma)
Muv-Luv Alternative - Total Eclipse (Kriska Barchenowa)
Kimi to Kanojo to Kanojo no Koi (Sone Miyuki)
Seishun Hajimemashita! (Yoshino Shinonome)

2016
Aokana: Four Rhythm Across the Blue (Botan Arisaka)
Breath of Fire 6 (Elise)
Overwatch (Symmetra)
Girls' Frontline (M1887, Agent)

2017
Fire Emblem Heroes (Catria, L'Arachel)

2018
Princess Connect! Re:Dive (Shizuru / Shizuru Hoshino)
Soulcalibur VI (Amy)
Azur Lane (Friedrich der Große)

2019
Onmyoji (Takiyasha Hime)
Arknights (Gladiia)
The Seven Deadly Sins: Grand Cross (Camila)
Pokémon Masters (Olivia)

2020
Illusion Connect - Selena

2023Sword Art Online: Last Recollection (Fanatio)

Drama CD07-Ghost (Riria)Rakka Ryūsui (Akatsuki Ayase)White Album 2 (Kazusa Touma)Kotonoha no Miko to Kotodama no Majo to Drama CD (Gretia Dietrich)Cyborg 009 Drama Album: Love Stories (Eva Klein)Aokana: Four Rhythm Across the Blue (Botan Arisaka)

Tokusatsu
2015
Kamen Rider Ghost (Insect Ganma (ep. 7 - 8))

Dubbing

Live-actionI Love You, Beth Cooper (Beth Cooper (Hayden Panettiere))Halo (Commander Miranda Keyes (Olive Gray))The Hunger Games: Catching Fire (Johanna Mason (Jena Malone))The Hunger Games: Mockingjay – Part 1 (Johanna Mason (Jena Malone))The Hunger Games: Mockingjay – Part 2 (Johanna Mason (Jena Malone))Wander (Shelly Luscomb (Heather Graham))

References

Sources
 Taniguchi, Hiroshi et al. "The Official Art of Canvas2 ~Nijiiro no Sketch~". (November 2006) Newtype USA''. pp. 101–107.

External links
Official blog 
Official agency profile 

1976 births
Living people
Anime singers
Japanese actresses
Japanese stage actresses
Japanese video game actresses
Japanese voice actresses
Japanese women pop singers
Ken Production voice actors
Musicians from Niigata Prefecture
Voice actresses from Niigata Prefecture
Voice actresses from Yokohama
20th-century Japanese actresses
21st-century Japanese actresses
21st-century Japanese women singers
21st-century Japanese singers